Krista Buecking (born 1982) is a Canadian visual artist.

Biography 
Krista Buecking was born in Brampton, Ontario in 1982, and currently lives in Los Angeles, California. From 2002 to 2007, she attended Guelph University in Guelph, Ontario, and in 2012 she completed a Master of Fine Arts degree at California Institute of the Arts.

Art practice 
Krista Buecking's work consists of large-scale sculptures, drawings and installations that explore often sentiments of disappointment, disintegration and renewal. WE THING, her most recent solo exhibition, consisted of architectural, sculptural, plant and video components that attempted to illustrate the intangible, abstract system of neoliberalism.  As Ellyn Walker writes in Magenta Magazine, "WE THING [..] reiterates our identity as that of social construct, rooted in the premise of a lifestyle promised, and formerly believed unattainable" Some of Buecking's earlier work consists of drawings of lyrics from classic American pop songs by artists such as Patsy Cline and Elvis Presley, such as That's when your heartaches begin and Are You Lonesome Tonight? As Rosemary Heather writes in a 2010 article in Canadian Art, " Within American pop songs Buecking has located deeper truths about the culture that produced them. Endless change and a taste for the ephemeral have produced the conditions for a rootless population." In her series of drawings from 2007-2008 entitled Proposal for Ruins, Buecking examined various states of disintegration and renewal in a set of modernist buildings that she depicts in ruin. In this series, Buecking selected historical buildings with back stories that connected with the fall-outs from ideological and political impulses of Modernism, such as Frank Lloyd Wright's Fallingwater and  Adalberto Libera's Casa Malaparte.

References

Further reading 
Adler, Dan. Krista Buecking at Susan Hobbs. Artforum, April 2010;
Day-Myron, Duncan. "Black Diamond Society sneaks thought-provoking art on campus". The Ontarion, 12 April 2007;
Dault, Gary Michael.  Krista Buecking at Susan Hobbs. The Globe and Mail, 9 January 2010;
Dean, Ann. Five Notes. Magenta Magazine, 3 February 2010;
Sandals, Leah. Düsseldorf Do. Now Magazine, vol.27, no.46 (17–24 July 2008);
Tong, Benjamin. Benjamin Tong on Krista Buecking. FrameWork 9/12, September 2012 ; 
Woodley, E.C. The Weight of the Ocean (exhibition brochure). Toronto: Mercer Union, 2010.

1982 births
Living people
Artists from Ontario
Canadian contemporary artists
Canadian installation artists
Canadian sculptors
Canadian women artists
People from Brampton
California Institute of the Arts alumni
University of Guelph alumni